St. Joseph's College (SJC) is in Calcutta, West Bengal, India, providing school education under the ICSE/ISC school system. The school completed its quasquicentennial year of existence in 2015.

History
In 1830, a free school was established for the Goan community in Mr. Cooper's residence in 69 Bowbazar Street. This was later taken over by the Calcutta Brothers who built a single building in the present location of the school.

In 1842, Vicar Apostolic Monsignor Carew of Calcutta was keenly aware of the increasing number of British and European children made fatherless by disease or battle. He saw the need for congregations of Nuns and Brothers to care for and teach these poor children who were termed 'war orphans'. His immediate choice was the Loreto Sisters and the Irish Christian Brothers. The founding of the school was done about forty years earlier, by a Waterford businessman, Edmund Rice , who had just lost his wife. However, while the Irish nuns arrived in India in 1844 and took up residence at Middleton Row, the Christian Brothers were unable to spare any Brothers for the Indian Mission. As an alternative, the Brothers offered to train men who would form the nucleus of the new Congregation in India. Accordingly, in September 1847, two young men, Br. Francis Fitzpatrick and his cousin, Br. Alphonsus Tolan, having completed their short spell of training in Ireland, began their long and wearisome voyage around the Cape of Good Hope to Calcutta, arriving on 15 February 1848. They immediately set up the new community of the Calcutta Brothers in the Cathedral compound, Murghihata. Br. Francis took charge of the orphanage at Murghihata while Br. Alphonsus travelled each day to look after the Boys' Free School in Bow Bazar. The little Congregation grew slowly but received a setback when both Vicar Apostolic Carew and Br. Francis died in 1855.

It was only in January 1890, that the Irish Christian Brothers were able to set up their mission on a firm footing when five Brothers (Vincent Casey, Fabian Kenneally, Edward Aherne and Ambrose Flynn) came to Calcutta from Ireland at the request of Pope Leo XII. Br. Casey was appointed Provincial Visitor and the amalgamation of the four Irish Christian Brothers and sixteen Calcutta Brothers took place. The brothers were fond of little children and often spent large amounts of time teaching them.

St. Joseph's College 

In 1894, a new building, the present red- brick structure, was erected under the direction of Br. Joseph Moyes and is now St. Joseph's College, Bow Bazar . This became the Head Office of the Christian Brothers till it was moved to St. Columba's School, New Delhi, in 1980. The work that the Brothers were doing received recognition and requests came from several Catholic Bishops for the Brothers to open schools in their dioceses. At the turn of the century – there were nearly fifty Brothers in India, both Irish and Anglo-Indian, and a training house for Brothers (novitiate) was started at Mt Carmel's, overlooking Goethals.

St. Joseph's College was affiliated to the ICSE and ISC Boards in the year 1970. In 1994, Aashirvaad Vidyalaya, a bilingual school for the children of migrant workers, was opened on the St. Joseph's and St George's campuses.

St. George's School is a tuition-free school which is run and managed by St. Joseph's College providing quality education to those who cannot afford it. The books and uniforms all are provided for by St. Joseph's College.

Principals
1890–93  – Br. T F Kenneally
1894–99  – Br. M O Brien
1900–09  – Br. J L Maher
1910–12  – Br. J A Ryan
1913–19  – Br. T B Meloney
1920–24  – Br. J L Maher
1925–29  – Br. P F Lillis
1930–33  – Br. D M Lonergan
1934–35  – Br. J G Pakenham
1935–40  – Br. D M Lonergan
1941–46  – Br. J E Mcloughlin
1947–48  – Br. M M Delaney
1948–49  – Br. G C Webster
1949–54  – Br. T C Comber
1955–60  – Br. P C Hart
1961–65  – Br. J A McPhilemy
1966–67  – Br. M D Curran
1968–69  – Br. J N Foley
1969–71  – Br. M B Finn
1971–75  – Br. C P Gaffney
1975–80  – Br. M D O’Donohue
1981–84  – Br. J B Corbett
1984–90  – Br. C J Harrison
1990–92  – Br. E L Miranda
1992–93  – Br. M D O’Donohue
1994–96  – Br. G A Menezes
1996–10  – Mr. N McNamara
2010–20  – Mrs. J Banerjee
2020–22  – Br. L D Lobo
2022–present  – '''Br. A F Pinto

Curriculum

Value education
A programme for religious education of Catholic boys is conducted and a programme for imparting social values to non-Catholic boys is conducted twice every week.

Academics
In the Junior school (Nursery to 4), the emphasis is on the acquiring of skills and providing experiences and activities that lead the child to respond to the world around him. The child's progress is assessed by evaluation of regular work. Promotion is automatic.

In the Middle school (5 to 7), a student's progress is assessed through routine work, unit tests and semester examinations. Promotion to higher classes depend on the child's performance in all assessments.

In the Senior school (8 to 12), students must follow the courses of ICSE & ISC.

Extracurricular activities
Apart from studies, students are expected to take part in extra curricular activities, such as sports, art, listening and speaking, music, dance, or to be part of various extra curricular clubs like social justice club, nature, eco club and science club.

School Session
The academic year is from April to March. Classes are held every Monday to Friday and three annual vacation periods are given – Summer Vacations, Puja Vacations and Winter Vacations.

During the school session, several events take place such as Annual Concert, Josephtsyna and Creation Week. Annual Prize Distribution and Investiture Ceremony takes place annually on the last working day before Winter vacation. School Picnics are also organised every year for students as well as staff.

Notable alumni

Arindam Sil (actor, film director and line producer)
Raj Kamal Jha, writer, Editor, author
Shantanu Maheshwari (actor, choreographer, dancer)

References

External links
 

Congregation of Christian Brothers schools in India
Catholic secondary schools in India
Christian schools in West Bengal
Primary schools in West Bengal
High schools and secondary schools in Kolkata
1890 establishments in India
Educational institutions established in 1890